The Tomb of Shaykh Haydar is built by the Ilkhanate and This building is located in Meshginshahr، This Tomb to Shaykh Haydar is the father of Ismail I.

Sources 

Mausoleums in Iran
National works of Iran